Integrin alpha-1 also CD49a is an integrin alpha subunit encoded in humans by the gene ITGA1. It makes up half of the α1β1 integrin duplex.

References

Further reading

External links
 
ITGA1 Info with links in the Cell Migration Gateway 
 
 PDBe-KB provides an overview of all the structure information available in the PDB for Human Integrin alpha-1 

Integrins